Healthy environment is a standard whose registrar is the Bureau de Normalisation du Québec. The standard aims to recognize companies that have implemented actions of workplace health promotion and workplace wellness.

The standard has 5 main requirements :
 Executive engagement in practices that promote health and wellness in the workplace;
 The institution of a health and wellness committee that collects suggestions from employees;
 Perform a data collection to establish a clear picture of employee health;
 Implement strategies or activities to promote health or prevent disease;
 Evaluate activities that have been implemented

To be recognized a company has to act in at least two of the following areas of action.
 Healthy behaviors (mandatory)
 Management practices
 Workplace environment
 Work–life balance

History 

The standard was developed in 2008. Its development was funded by the commission for the health and security of workers, Desjardins financial security, the Quebec ministry of health and by Power Corporation of Canada.

To this date 53 companies have met the standards that are required to be certified as Healthy Enterprise's.

See also 
 Entreprise en santé

References

Occupational safety and health
Workplace